Dominik Hollý (born 11 November 2003) is a Slovak professional footballer who plays as a midfielder for AS Trenčín.

Club career

AS Trenčín
Hollý made his Fortuna Liga debut for AS Trenčín in an away fixture at pod Dubňom against Žilina on 11 September 2021. He came on as a 90th minute replacement for Samuel Lavrinčík with the final score already set at 1:3 in favour of Trenčín, set by Madu, Kadák and Azango, as well as Dávid Ďuriš's strike for Šošoni.

He debuted in the starting-XI over a month later in an away fixture against ViOn Zlaté Moravce. After 73 goal-less minutes, Hollý was replaced by Abdul Zubairu. AS had won eventually through Lavrinčík's stoppage time goal.

International career
In December 2022, Hollý was first recognised in a Slovak senior national team nomination and was immediately shortlisted by Francesco Calzona for prospective players' training camp at NTC Senec.

References

External links
 AS Trenčín official club profile 
 Futbalnet profile 
 
 

2003 births
Living people
People from Bánovce nad Bebravou
Sportspeople from the Trenčín Region
Slovak footballers
Slovakia youth international footballers
Association football defenders
AS Trenčín players
2. Liga (Slovakia) players
Slovak Super Liga players